"Sense of Doubt" is an instrumental piece written by David Bowie in 1977 for the album "Heroes". It was the first of three instrumentals on Side Two of the original vinyl album that segued into one another, preceding "Moss Garden" and "Neuköln".

Cited as "portentous" and "thoroughly foreboding", "Sense of Doubt" is one of the darker tracks of the album, with a descending four-note piano motif juxtaposed with "an eerie synth line like a scrap of sound from a silent expressionist-era soundtrack". Brian Eno suggested that the contrasting themes were the result of him and Bowie each following an Oblique Strategies card to guide them in the track's overdubbing, Eno's directing him to "make everything as similar as possible" and Bowie's to "emphasize differences".

"Sense of Doubt" was performed on the Italian TV programme L’altra domenica in 1977 and throughout the "Heroes" tour in 1978.

Live versions

 Performances from the 1978 "Heroes" tour have been released on Stage (1978) and Welcome to the Blackout (2018).

Other releases

 It was released as the B-side of the single "Beauty and the Beast" in January 1978, a pairing that NME editors Roy Carr and Charles Shaar Murray considered "must be good fun on pub juke-boxes".
 A picture disc release appeared in the RCA Life Time picture disc set.
 The film Christiane F. and its soundtrack featured the song.

Cover versions

 Philip Glass – "Heroes" Symphony (1996)
 Musician Steve Adey covered the track on his 2017 LP "Do Me a Kindness".
 Shearwater – as part of a live performance of the entire Berlin Trilogy for WNYC (2018)

Notes

David Bowie songs
1977 songs
Rock instrumentals
Songs written by David Bowie
Song recordings produced by David Bowie
Song recordings produced by Tony Visconti